Cernach mac Fergusa (died 805)  was a King of in South Brega of the Uí Chernaig sept of Lagore of the Síl nÁedo Sláine branch of the Southern Uí Néill. He was the son of Fergus mac Fogartaig (died 751) and brother of Máel Dúin mac Fergusa (died 785) and Ailill mac Fergusa (died 800), previous kings.

Cernach succeeded his brother Ailill as King of Lagore but the rule of South Brega went to a subsept of the Uí Chernaig, the Síl Conaill Graint which were based at Calatrium. He ruled as King of Lagore from 800-805. At his death notice in the annals, he is called rex Locha Gabor -King of Lagore. The title King of Loch Gabor was used when members of this sept were not Kings of South Brega (instead held by the sub-sept Síl Conaill Graint).

Notes

References

 Charles-Edwards, T. M. (2000), Early Christian Ireland, Cambridge: Cambridge University Press, 
 Mac Niocaill, Gearoid (1972), Ireland before the Vikings, Dublin: Gill and Macmillan

External links
CELT: Corpus of Electronic Texts at University College Cork

Kings of Brega
9th-century Irish monarchs
805 deaths
Year of birth unknown